Christoffer Fagerli Rukke (born 17 April 1988) is a Norwegian speed-skater who competes for the club Hol IL. He represented Norway at the 2010 Winter Olympics in Vancouver. Before the 2012–13 season, Rukke has started 78 individual races in the World Cup, with 11th place as best three times.

References

1988 births
Living people
People from Hol
Norwegian male speed skaters
Olympic speed skaters of Norway
Speed skaters at the 2010 Winter Olympics
Sportspeople from Viken (county)